Kiełbasa (Kielbasa without diacritics and other variants) is a Polish surname literally meaning "sausage" (kielbasa).

Notable people with the name Kiełbasa/Kielbasa include:
Max Kielbasa (1921–1980), American football player
Oliwia Kiołbasa (born 2000), Polish chess player
Peter Kiołbassa (1837–1905), Chicago politician
 (1425–1479), Polish Catholic priest and bishop of Chełm
Władysław Kiełbasa (1893–1939), Polish Army officer

See also

Polish-language surnames